UFC on ESPN: Font vs. Vera (also known as UFC on ESPN 35 and UFC Vegas 53) was a mixed martial arts event produced by the Ultimate Fighting Championship that took place on April 30, 2022, at the UFC Apex facility in Enterprise, Nevada, part of the Las Vegas Metropolitan Area, United States.

Background
A bantamweight bout between Rob Font and Marlon Vera headlined the event. At the weigh-ins, Font weighed in at 138.5 pounds, two and half pounds over the division non-title fight limit. The bout proceeded at a catchweight with Font forfeiting 20% of his purse to Vera.

A women's strawweight bout between former Invicta FC Atomweight Champion and UFC Women's Strawweight Championship challenger Jessica Penne and Luana Pinheiro was expected to take place at UFC Fight Night: Vieira vs. Tate in last November, but Penne withdrew from the bout due to undisclosed reasons. The pairing was rebooked for this event. They were once again scrapped as Pinheiro pulled out due to an undisclosed injury.

A lightweight bout between Joe Lauzon and former UFC Lightweight Championship challenger Donald Cerrone was scheduled for the event. However, the bout was moved to UFC 274 on May 7 due to undisclosed reasons.

A lightweight bout between Jared Gordon and Rafael Alves was scheduled for the event. However, Alves withdrew from the event due to undisclosed reasons and was replaced by Grant Dawson.

Justin Tafa and Jake Collier were expected to meet in a heavyweight bout at the event. However, Tafa withdrew from event due to undisclosed reasons was replaced by former UFC Heavyweight Champion Andrei Arlovski.

A women's flyweight bout between Antonina Shevchenko and Cortney Casey was expected to take place at this event. However, the bout was postponed to UFC Fight Night 209 in July due to Shevchenko injuring her knee in training.

A heavyweight bout between Alexander Romanov and Chase Sherman was expected to take place one week prior at UFC Fight Night: Lemos vs. Andrade. However, the bout was pushed back to this event after Sherman was deemed unable to compete due to a minor health issue.

A flyweight bout between Tatsuro Taira and Carlos Candelario was expected to take place at the event. However, just hours before the event the bout was scratched due to Candelario suffering from an illness and was rescheduled to UFC on ESPN: Błachowicz vs. Rakić.

Results

Bonus awards
The following fighters received $50,000 bonuses.
 Fight of the Night: Marlon Vera vs. Rob Font
 Performance of the Night: Joanderson Brito and Francisco Figueiredo

See also 

 List of UFC events
 List of current UFC fighters
 2022 in UFC

References 

UFC on ESPN
2022 in mixed martial arts
April 2022 sports events in the United States
2022 in sports in Nevada
Mixed martial arts in Las Vegas
Sports competitions in Las Vegas